Diane Landry (born 1958) is a Canadian contemporary artist. Landry is known for her kinetic sculptural works and performances that utilize light, shadow, sound and movement.

Work
In Landry's work École d'aviation, numerous motorized umbrellas with built-in accordions are installed so as to give the impression they are about to take off as they move.

Awards
In 2007, she was awarded the inaugural Prix Giverny Capital for her contributions to Quebecois culture. In 2014 Landry received the Jean Paul Riopelle Career Grant from the Conseil des arts et des lettres du Québec. In 2015, Landry was a recipient of a Guggenheim fellowship in fine arts.

Exhibitions and performances

Individual exhibitions and performances

1998
La Morue: November 4, 1998, centre des arts actuels SKOL, Montréal, Québec, Canada

1993
Stratégie parallèle: VU, Centre d'Animation et de Diffusion de la Photographie, Québec City, Québec, Canada 
ABBOX with Jocelyn Robert: Obscure, Québec, Canada
Environ 8,000 kilometrès with Jocelyn Robert: Skol, Montréal, Québec, Canada; Memorial University Art Gallery, St. John's, Newfoundland, Canada; Pitt Gallery, Vancouver, British Columbia, Canada; Open Space, Victoria, British Columbia, Canada, Galerie Sans Nom, Moncton, New Brunswick, Canada; Langage Plus, Alma, Québec, Canada

1991
Environ 8,000 kilometrès with Jocelyn Robert: Musée Régional de la Côte-Nord, Sept-Iles, Québec, Canada; Obscure, Québec, Canada
Risque d'averse: La Centrale, Montréal, Québec, Canada

1990
Risque d'averse: La chambre blanche, Québec, Canada; Musée du Bas-Saint-Laurent, Rivière-du-Loup, Québec, Canada
It's gonna rain: Niagara Artists' Centre, St. Catherines, Ontario, Canada

1989
It's gonna rain: X-Changes Gallery, Victoria, British Columbia, Canada
2nd Story Gallery, Calgary, Alberta, Canada

Group exhibitions

2018
 2018: Collumina - International Light Art Project Cologne with Elisabeth Brockmann, Rafram Chaddad, Cuppetelli and Mendoza, Hartung | Trenz, Sonia Kallel, Ken Matzubara, molitor & kuzmin, Anna Rosa Rupp, Christine Sciulli, Tilen Sepic, Kurt Laurenz Theinert und Lukas Pearse. Among the selected sites are Museum für Angewandte Kunst (Cologne) and  Imhoff-Schokoladenmuseum. Artistic director is Bettina Pelz.

1992
Computers & Human Interaction Conference '92 with Jocelyn Robert: Monterey, California, USA
Événement "Poisson d'avril": L'OEil de Poission, Québec, Canada

1991
Biennale Découverte: Musée du Québec, Québec, Canada

References

1958 births
Canadian women artists
Canadian installation artists
Canadian sculptors
Canadian performance artists
Women performance artists
Artists from Quebec
Canadian contemporary artists
Living people